The Parliament of Ghana is the legislative body of the Government of Ghana.

History
Legislative representation in Ghana dates back to 1850, when the country was a British colony known as Gold Coast. The body, called the Legislative Council, was purely advisory as the Governor exercised all legislative and executive powers. Reforms were introduced in 1916 and 1925, although the governor's power remained extensive. In 1946, a new constitution was introduced that allowed for an unofficial member of the Legislative Council to become its president while the governor ceased to be the ex officio president of the body. This system continued until 1951 when the Legislature elected its first Speaker - Sir Emmanuel Charles Quist.

1951 was also the first year that elections based on universal suffrage were held. The Convention People's Party (CPP), which was formed in 1949 and led by Kwame Nkrumah, won the election. Another party, the United Gold Coast Convention (UGCC) led by J.B. Danquah, fared poorly, and was disbanded soon after. Nkrumah, who had been jailed in early 1950 for subversion, was released and appointed Leader of Government Business, becoming the country's first Prime Minister the following year.

Legislative Assembly elections held in 1954 resulted in another CPP victory, with the party winning 71 out of a total of 104 seats. It also won 71 out of 104 seats in the 1956 Legislative Assembly election. The Gold Coast was renamed Ghana and granted independence on 6 March 1957, while retaining the British monarch as head of state. The Legislative Assembly was renamed National Assembly.

After the approval of a new Republican constitution, Ghana officially became a republic on 1 July 1960 with Kwame Nkrumah as its President. The plebiscite was taken as a fresh mandate from the people and the terms of National Assembly members were extended for another five years. A one-party state was introduced following a referendum in 1964. As a result, only CPP candidates stood in the National Assembly Election held in 1965. Nkrumah was overthrown in 1966 by the military, which banned political parties and dissolved the National Assembly.

The country returned to civilian rule in 1969. Elections held on 29 August resulted in victory for the Progress Party (PP) of Kofi Abrefa Busia, which won 105 of the National Assembly's 140 seats. He took office as Prime Minister on 3 September 1969. His government was toppled in a 1972 military coup.

During the Third Republic, which lasted from 1979 to 1981, the dominant party in the National Assembly was the People's National Party (PNP), led by Hilla Limann, which won 71 out of 104 seats in elections held on 18 June 1979. After the military intervened in 1981, all elected institutions were dissolved and political party activity was prohibited.

Parliament of the Fourth Republic
After 11 years of military rule, a new constitution was approved in a 1992 referendum. Presidential elections were held in November and were won by Jerry Rawlings, leader of the 1981 coup and subsequent military ruler. The opposition contested the results and boycotted the December parliamentary elections. As a result, Rawlings'  National Democratic Congress (NDC) won 189 out of 200 seats in Parliament.

All parties participated in the 1996 parliamentary elections. The NDC won 133 out of a total of 200 seats, while the main opposition New Patriotic Party (NPP) won 60. Two small parties won the remaining seats.

The 2000 elections were significant in that President Rawlings was constitutionally barred from seeking another term. In the presidential poll, John Kufuor of the NPP defeated the NDC candidate John Atta Mills in a run-off election. In the 200-seat Parliament, the NPP won 100, followed by the NDC's 92. Small political parties and independents won the remaining seats.

Kufuor was re-elected in 2004 and the New Patriotic Party (NPP) won 128 out of 230 seats in the concurrent parliamentary election. The main opposition National Democratic Congress (NDC) won 94, while two other parties - The People's National Convention (PNC) and Convention People's Party (CPP) - won 4 and 3 seats, respectively. An Independent captured the remaining seat.

The simple majority (or First Past the Post) voting system is used in Ghana's parliamentary elections. Since 2012, the country is divided into 275 single-member constituencies. Members serve four-year terms.

Leadership structure

Speaker - The Speaker presides over the Parliament and enforces observance of all rules that govern its conduct. After a general election the majority party in Parliament, in consultation with other parties, nominates a Speaker.

The Speaker cannot be a Member of Parliament though they must possess the qualifications to stand for elections as a Member of Parliament, such person on appointment as Speaker must resign and declare the seat occupied in Parliament as vacant. The Speaker is assisted by two Deputy Speakers (First and Second Deputy Speakers), who are elected at the commencement of every Parliament. They must come from different political parties. The current Speaker is Alban Kingsford Sumani Bagbin.

First Deputy Speaker - The First Deputy Speaker presides over the sittings of Parliament whenever the Speaker is absent. The current First Deputy Speaker is Joseph Osei Owusu of the New Patriotic Party (NPP).
Second Deputy Speaker - The Second Deputy Speaker presides over the sittings of Parliament in the absence of the Speaker and the First Deputy Speaker. The current Second Deputy Speaker is Andrew Amoako Asiamah an independent candidate.
Majority Leader - The Majority Leader is elected from the party with a majority of parliamentary seats. A deputy majority leader and a majority chief whip assist him, constituting the majority leadership of Parliament. The current Majority Leader is Osei Kyei-Mensah Bonsu of the NPP.
Deputy Majority Leader- A deputy majority leader and a chief whip assist him, constituting the Majority leadership of Parliament. The current Deputy Majority Leader is Alexander Afenyo-Markin of the NPP.
Minority Leader - The Minority leader is elected from the second largest party in Parliament. A deputy minority leader and a chief whip assist him, constituting the minority leadership of Parliament. The current Minority Leader is Haruna Iddrisu of the NDC.
Deputy Minority Leader - A deputy minority leader and a chief whip assist him, constituting the minority leadership of Parliament. The current Deputy Minority Leader is James Klutse Avedzi of the NDC.

2008 elections

Composition of Parliament after the 2018 Ghanaian new regions referendum

Committees of Parliament
As at November 2020, the Parliament had fourteen Standing Committees and sixteen Select Committees. There was also one ad hoc committee.

Ad-hoc Committee:
Poverty Reduction Strategy committee

Past Speakers of the National Assembly/Parliament

Gold Coast (1951 – 1957)
Speaker of the Legislative Assembly, and National Assembly in 1957

Independent State within the Commonwealth (1957 – 1960) / First Republic (1960 – 1966)

Speakers of the National Assembly

Second Republic (1969 – 1972)
Speaker of the National Assembly

Third Republic (1979 – 1981)
Speaker of the National Assembly

Fourth Republic (1992 – present)
Speakers of Parliament

Members of parliament
For a list of current members, see List of MPs elected in the 2020 Ghanaian general election.
The composition of the Parliament has changed over the years. There were 140 members in both the Second and the Third Republic parliaments.
2nd Republic parliament: 1969 — 1972
3rd Republic parliament: 1979 — 1981
In the current Fourth Republic, the number of MPs first increased to 200 and subsequently to 275. There have been 8 parliaments so far in the Fourth Republic. The list of its members are below.
1st parliament: 1993 — 1997
2nd parliament: 1997 — 2001
3rd parliament: 2001 — 2005
4th parliament: 2005 — 2009
5th parliament: 2009 — 2013
6th parliament: 2013 — 2017
7th parliament: 2017 — 2021
8th parliament: 2021 — present

Parliamentary constituencies

See also
Speaker of the Parliament of Ghana
Ghana
History of Ghana
Legislative Branch
List of national legislatures
List of Ghana Parliament constituencies

References

External links

 
Politics of Ghana
Ghana
Ghana
Ghana